The 2008–09 Santosh Trophy was the 63rd edition of Santosh Trophy, a football tournament in India. In the final, held in Chennai, Goa beat West Bengal by 4–2 on penalties after a 0–0 draw.

Background 
The tournament was held in Tamil Nadu for the tenth time; first time in 1955 and last in 1999. The latter edition saw West Bengal winning its 29th and last title before entering the 2008–09 tournament. Punjab entered the tournament on the back of two wins and were looking for a hat-trick of titles. The qualification round of the tournament was held in for venues: Chennai, Tiruvallur, Coimbatore and Tiruchirappalli.

Qualification

Knockout stage

Quarter-final Group A

Quarter-final Group B

Semi-finals

Final 
The match was a repeat of the final of the 1998–99 edition. Bengal made the final for the 40th time and Goa for their 12th time. It was the sixth meeting of the two teams in the final, with Bengal winning on five occasions and once the trophy shared. Goa entered the final having kept a clean sheet throughout the tournament.

References

2008–09 in Indian football
2008–09 Santosh Trophy
2008–09
2008–09 domestic association football cups